Mohammad "Mo" Gawdat  (Arabic: محمد جودت) is an Egyptian entrepreneur and writer. He is the former chief business officer for Google X and author of the book Solve for Happy.

Early life
Gawdat was born in Egypt, the son of a civil engineer and an English professor. He showed early interest in technology.

Career

Gawdat's background is as an engineer, paired with an MBA degree from Maastricht School of Management in the Netherlands.

He began his career at IBM Egypt as a systems engineer, before migrating to a sales role in the government sector. Moving to the United Arab Emirates, he joined NCR Abu Dhabi to cover the non-finance sector. At Microsoft, he assumed various roles over a span of seven-and-a-half years.

Gawdat joined Google in 2007 to start its business in emerging markets.

In 2013, he moved to Google's innovation arm, Google X, where he led business strategy, planning, sales, business development, and partnerships.

Gawdat is the author of Solve for Happy: Engineering Your Path to Joy (2017). Dedicated to his son Ali, who died in 2014, the book outlines methods for managing and preventing disappointment.

Personal life
Gawdat is separated from his wife, Nibal, whom he met at university. They have a daughter, Aya. Their son, Ali, died in 2014.

References

1967 births
Living people
Egyptian businesspeople
Egyptian writers
Egyptian emigrants to the United States
Google employees